Peter Alter (born July 22, 1940, in Parchim) is emeritus professor of modern and contemporary history at the University of Duisburg-Essen, Germany, and a specialist in nationalism and the twentieth century history of the United Kingdom. He is a former research fellow and deputy director of the German Historical Institute London.

Selected publications

English language
 The reluctant patron. Science and the state in Britain, 1850–1920. Berg, Oxford, Hamburg 1987, .
 Nationalism. Arnold, London 1989, .
 Out of the Third Reich: Refugee historians in post-war Britain. Tauris, New York, London 1998,  (Ed.)
 The German question and Europe. A history. Arnold, London 2000, .

German language
 Die irische Nationalbewegung zwischen Parlament und Revolution. Der konstitutionelle Nationalismus in Irland 1880–1918, Oldenbourg, München, Wien 1971 (zugleich: Universität Köln, phil. Diss., 1970), .
 Gesellschaft und Demokratie in Nordirland, Klett, Stuttgart 1974, .
 Der Imperialismus. Grundlagen, Probleme, Theorien, Klett, Stuttgart 1979, .
 Winston Churchill (1874–1965). Leben und Überleben, Kohlhammer Verlag, Stuttgart 2006, .
 Die Windsors. Geschichte einer Dynastie, Beck, München 2009, .
 Nationalismus. Ein Essay über Europa. Alfred Körner Verlag, Stuttgart 2016, 190 S.

References

External links
 

1940 births
20th-century German historians
Living people
Academics of the German Historical Institute London
Academic staff of the University of Duisburg-Essen
Scholars of nationalism
Historians of the British Isles
German expatriates in the United Kingdom
21st-century German historians